A pancake pen is a cooking tool used to distribute batter onto a griddle or a pan. Typically constructed from a plastic squeeze bottle, a pancake pen is utilized to create creative pancake shapes known as pancake art. The pancake pen is used by filling with batter and squeezing onto a hot griddle, usually lubricated with some form of oil to prevent sticking to the pan. The pancake batter is usually colored with Food Coloring and used to make edible art.

See also
 Pancake

References

Pancakes
Food preparation utensils